Skylon is a series of concept designs for a reusable single-stage-to-orbit spaceplane by the British company Reaction Engines Limited (Reaction), using SABRE, a combined-cycle, air-breathing rocket propulsion system. The vehicle design is for a hydrogen-fuelled aircraft that would take off from a specially built reinforced runway, and accelerate to Mach 5.4 at  altitude (compared to typical airliner's ) using the atmosphere's oxygen before switching the engines to use the internal liquid oxygen (LOX) supply to take it into orbit. The relatively light vehicle would then re-enter the atmosphere and land on a runway, being protected from the conditions of re-entry by a ceramic composite skin. When on the ground, it would undergo inspection and necessary maintenance, with a turnaround time of approximately two days, and be able to complete at least 200 orbital flights per vehicle.

As work on the project has progressed, information has been published on a number of design versions, including A4, C1, C2, and D1. Testing of the key technologies was successfully completed in November 2012, allowing Skylon's design to advance from its research phase to a development phase. , the groundworks for an engine test facility have been completed at Westcott and current plans are for the plant to be completed and the first ground-based engine tests to begin in 2021, and SABRE engines could be performing uncrewed test flights in a "hypersonic testbed" (HTB) by 2025.

In paper studies, the cost per kilogram (kg) of payload carried to LEO in this way is hoped to be reduced from the current £1,108/kg, including research and development, to around £650/kg (718.16USD/Kg), with costs expected to fall much more over time after initial expenditures have amortised. In 2004, the developer estimated the total lifetime cost of the Skylon C1 programme to be about $12 billion. , only a small portion of the funding required to develop and build Skylon had been secured. For the first couple of decades the work was privately funded, with public funding beginning in 2009 through a European Space Agency (ESA) contract. The British government pledged £60 million to the project on 16 July 2013 to allow a prototype of the SABRE engine to be built; contracts for this funding were signed in 2015.

Research and development programme

Background and early work
Skylon has its origins within a previous space development programme for an envisioned single-stage-to-orbit (SSTO) spaceplane, known as HOTOL. In 1982, when work commenced on the HOTOL by several British companies, there was significant international interest to develop and produce viable reusable launch systems, perhaps the most high-profile of these being the NASA-operated Space Shuttle. In conjunction with British Aerospace and Rolls-Royce, a promising design emerged to which the British government contributed £2 million towards its refinement; British engineer Alan Bond was amongst the engineers who worked on HOTOL. However, during 1988, the British government decided to withdraw further funding from the programme, resulting in development work being terminated. Aerospace publication Flight International observed that HOTOL and other competing spaceplane programmes were "over-ambitious" and that development on such launch systems would involve more research and slower progress than previously envisioned.

Following the setback of HOTOL's cancellation, in 1989 Alan Bond, along with John Scott-Scott and Richard Varvill decided to establish their own company, Reaction Engines Limited, to pursue the development of a viable spaceplane and associated technology using private funding. In 1993, Reaction publicly revealed its spaceplane proposal, which it named Skylon after the Skylon structure that had inspired Alan Bond at the Festival of Britain exhibition. Skylon was a clean sheet redesign based on lessons learned during development of HOTOL, the new concept again utilised dual-mode propulsion system, using engines that could combust hydrogen with the external air during atmospheric flight.
Early on, Skylon was promoted by the company to the ESA for its Future European Space Transportation Investigations Programme (FESTIP) initiative, as well as seeking out both government or commercial investment in order to finance the vehicle's development. Reaction has also sought to form ties with other companies with the aim of producing an international consortium of interested firms to participate in the Skylon programme.

Project brief
The Skylon design features several distinct differences when compared with the earlier HOTOL program. Whereas HOTOL would have launched from a rocket sled as a weight-saving measure, Skylon is to be equipped with conventional retractable undercarriage. The revised engine design, using the SABRE engine, is expected to offer higher performance than its predecessor. The rear mounted engine of HOTOL meant that the vehicle possessed intrinsically poor in-flight stability; early attempts to resolve this problem had ended up sacrificing much of HOTOL's payload potential, which in turn contributed to the failure of the overall project. Skylon's solution to the issue was to position its engines at the end of its wings, which located them further forward and much closer to the vehicle's longitudinal centre of mass, thereby resolving the instability problem.

Reaction intends ultimately to operate as a for-profit commercial enterprise which, upon the completion of development, shall manufacture Skylon vehicles for multiple international customers who shall operate their fleets directly, while being provided with support from Reaction. Skylon has been designed with the target of achieving no less than 200 flights per vehicle. According to the company, its business plan is to sell vehicles for $1 billion each, for which it has forecast a market for at least 30 Skylons, while recurring costs of just $10 million per flight are predicted to be incurred by operators. While the Reaction intends to manufacture some components directly, such as the engine precooler, other components have been designed by partner companies and a consortium of various aerospace firms is expected to handle full production of Skylon.

In service, Skylon could potentially lower the cost of launching satellites which, according to evidence submitted to the UK parliament by Reaction, is forecast to be around £650/kg; as of 2011, the average launch cost using conventional methods was estimated to be roughly £15,000/kg. Amongst other prospective operations, Skylon would be capable of transporting payloads of up to 10-tonnes to the International Space Station. Reaction has also completed internal studies into the use of Skylon as a launch platform for a network of space-based solar power satellites, which have been historically unfeasible due to high launch costs. According to business publication Management Today, Skylon has been discussed as a possible replacement for NASA's Space Shuttle programme.

Funding
Speaking in June 2011, Reaction estimated that it would require ultimately $12 billion to achieve an operational configuration, which was then estimated to be achieved around 2020, dependent on funding. The obtaining of additional financing for the Skylon programme from the British government has often been difficult. During 2000, Reaction issued an ultimately unsuccessful request for funding from the British government; according to the government, Reaction's proposal had involved an offer of a potentially large return on its investment. However, several officials have emerged as proponents and advocated for the official backing of the Skylon programme. Speaking in 2009, the former UK Minister for Science and Innovation, Lord Drayson, stated of Reaction: "This is an example of a British company developing world-beating technology with exciting consequences for the future of space."

During February 2009, following on from a series of extended discussions with the British National Space Centre (which later became the UK Space Agency), it was announced that a major funding agreement had been established between the British National Space Centre, ESA and Reaction, committing €1 million ($1.28 million) for the purpose of producing a demonstration engine for the Skylon programme by 2011. The initiative, known as the Technology Demonstration Programme, was scheduled to last approximately 2.5 years, during which further financing in the form of €1 million was made available by ESA. The 2009 agreement allowed Reaction to involve several external companies, including EADS-owned Astrium, the University of Bristol and the German Aerospace Center (DLR), in further development work. As a consequence of the enactment of the Technology Demonstration Programme, Reaction was able to transition from a Technology Readiness Level (TRL) of 2/3 up to 4/5 within a matter of months.

By 2012, according to the UK Space Agency, the funding required to develop and construct the entire craft has not yet been secured; as such, research and development work was at that point mainly focused on the engines alone, which was supported by an ESA grant of €1 million. In January 2011, Reaction submitted a proposal to the British Government requesting additional funding for the Skylon project. On 13 April 2011, Reaction announced that the design of the Skylon had passed several rigorous independent reviews. On 24 May 2011, ESA publicly declared the design to be feasible, having found "no impediments or critical items" to be present in the proposal. Speaking on the topic of Skylon in 2011, David Willetts, the UK Minister of State for Universities and Science, stated:

In June 2013, George Osborne, then Chancellor of the Exchequer, stated that the British government would be giving £60 million towards the further development of the SABRE engine. The grant was contingent upon Reaction having an industrial partner. The first grant of £50 million was approved by the European Commission in August 2015.

In October 2015, British defence conglomerate BAE Systems entered into an agreement with Reaction Engines, under which it would invest £20.6 million in Reaction to acquire 20% of its share capital, as well as to provide assistance in the development of the SABRE engine.

In July 2016, the second grant of £10 million was approved by ESA.

On 25 September 2017 it was announced that the U.S. Defense Advanced Research Projects Agency (DARPA) had awarded a contract to Reaction Engines for an undisclosed amount to conduct high-temperature airflow testing at a Colorado, United States site of a Reaction Engines precooler called HTX. Testing work is scheduled to start in 2018.

In April 2018, Reaction Engines announced Boeing and Rolls-Royce would be joining BAE Systems as investors in the development of the SABRE engine. A total of $37.5 million of new funding is to be provided including contributions from Baillie Gifford Asset Management and Woodford Investment Management.

Development

In 2000, the firm completed work with University of Bristol testing the precooler.

From 2007 to 2009 Reaction worked with University of Bristol and Airborne Engineering on Project STERN (Static Test Expansion/Deflection Rocket Nozzle), which tested Reaction's engine ignition system, a Reaction designed air breathing hydrogen rocket engine, and investigated the flow stability and behaviour of with Dr Neil Taylor's expansion deflection nozzle design via multiple test-firings by Airborne Engineering. An expansion deflection nozzle is capable of compensating for the changing ambient pressure encountered while gaining altitude during atmospheric flight, thus generating greater thrust and thereby efficiency.

Work on STERN was continued in project STRICT (Static Test Rocket Incorporating Cooled Thrust-chamber), which investigated the stability of the engine's exhaust flow and the dissipation of the generated heat into the engine walls. The results and designs delivered by both the STRICT and STERN projects were subsequently declared by Reaction to have been "a great success".

Static testing of the engine precooler began in June 2011, marking the start of Phase 3 in the Skylon development programme, In April 2012, Reaction announced that the first series of the precooler test programme had been successfully completed. On 10 July 2012, Reaction announced that the second of three series of tests has been completed successfully, and the final series of tests would begin the following month after the testing facilities had been upgraded to allow testing of  temperatures. ESA's propulsion division audited the precooler tests during mid-2012 and found the results satisfactory.

On 9 May 2011, Reaction stated that a preproduction prototype of the Skylon could be flying by 2016, and the proposed route would be a suborbital flight between the Guiana Space Centre near Kourou in French Guiana and the North European Aerospace Test Range, located in northern Sweden. Pre-orders are expected in the 2011–2013 time frame coinciding with the formation of the manufacturing consortium. On 8 December 2011, Alan Bond stated that Skylon would enter into service by 2021–2022 instead of 2020 as previously envisaged. On 13 July 2012, ESA Director-General Jean-Jacques Dordain publicly stated that the ESA would be holding a series of talks with Reaction with the aim of developing a further "technical understanding".

In November 2012, Reaction announced that it would commence work upon a three-and-a-half-year project to develop and build a test rig of the SABRE engine to prove its performance across both the air-breathing and rocket modes. Reaction's precooler tests are still ongoing as of July 2022.

Technology and design

Overview

The Skylon is a fully reusable SSTO vehicle, able to achieve orbit without staging, which is intended to be used principally as a reusable launch system. Proponents of the SSTO approach have often claimed that staging involves a number of inherent complications and problems due to complexity, such as being difficult or typically impossible to recover and reuse most elements, thus unavoidably incurring great expense to produce entirely new launch vehicles instead; therefore, they believe that SSTO designs hold the promise of providing a reduction to the high cost of space flights.

It is designed to be comparable with current payload dimensions, and able to support the containerisation of payloads that Reaction Engines envisions being produced in the future. Using interchangeable payload containers, Skylon could be fitted to carry satellites or fluid cargo into orbit, or, in a specialised habitation module, the latter being capable of housing a maximum of 30 astronauts during a single launch. Richard Varvill, technical director at Reaction, stated of Reaction's market: "we're competing with expendable rockets, a machine that is only used once".

Therefore, Skylon would be able to take off with much less total propellant than conventional systems. The weight reduction enabled by the lower quantity of propellant needed meant that the vehicle would not require as much lift or thrust, which in turn permits the use of smaller engines and allows for the use of a conventional wing configuration. While flying within the atmosphere, the use of wings to counteract gravity drag is more fuel-efficient than simply expelling propellant (as in a rocket), which again serves to reduce the total amount of propellant needed. The payload fraction would be significantly greater than normal rockets and the vehicle should be fully reusable, capable of performing in excess of 200 launches.

SABRE engines

One of the most significant features of the Skylon's design is its powerplant, known as Synergetic Air-Breathing Rocket Engine (SABRE). The design of the SABRE engine has drawn heavily upon the STRICT/STERN experimental engines, sharing many features such as the propellant and the adoption of the trialled Expansion Deflection Nozzle, as well as building upon the wider field of liquid air cycle engines (LACE). The proposed SABRE engine is not a scramjet, but a jet engine running combined cycles of a precooled jet engine, rocket engine and ramjet. Originally the key technology for this type of precooled jet engine did not exist, as it required a heat exchanger that was ten times lighter than the state of the art. Research conducted since then has achieved the necessary performance.

Operating an air-breathing jet engine at velocities of up to Mach 5.5 poses numerous engineering problems; several previous engines proposed by other designers have worked well as jet engines, but performed poorly as rockets. This engine design aims to be a good jet engine within the atmosphere, as well as being an excellent rocket engine outside; however, the conventional problem posed by operating at Mach 5.5 has been that the air coming into the engine rapidly heats up as it is compressed into the engine; due to certain thermodynamic effects, this greatly reduces the thrust that can be produced by burning fuel. Attempts to avoid these issues have typically resulted in the engine being much heavier (scramjets/ramjets) or has greatly reduced the thrust generated (conventional turbojets/ramjets); in either of these scenarios, the end result would be an engine that possesses a poor thrust to weight ratio at high speeds, which in turn would be too heavy to assist much in reaching orbit.

The SABRE engine design aims to avoid the historic weight-performance issue by using some of the liquid hydrogen fuel to cool helium within a closed-cycle precooler, which quickly reduces the temperature of the air at the inlet. The air is then used for combustion in a similar manner to a conventional jet engine. Once the helium has left the pre-cooler it is further heated by the products of the pre-burner giving it enough energy to drive the turbine and the liquid hydrogen pump. As a consequence of the air being cooled at all speeds, the jet can be built of light alloys and the weight is roughly halved. Additionally, more fuel can be burnt at high speeds. Beyond Mach 5.5, the air would normally become unusably hot despite the cooling; accordingly, the air inlet is closed upon attaining this speed and the engine instead is solely fed via on-board liquid oxygen and hydrogen fuel, as in a traditional rocket.

Fuselage and structure

The fuselage of the Skylon is expected to be a silicon carbide reinforced titanium space frame; a light and strong structure that supports the weight of the aluminium fuel tanks and to which the ceramic skin is attached. Multiple layers of titanium foil thermal insulation are sandwiched between the skin and frame to protect the inside of Skylon from the heat of hypersonic flight and the intense heat of re-entry.

Due to the vehicle's use of a low-density fuel in the form of liquid hydrogen, a great volume is required to contain enough energy to reach orbit. The propellant is intended to be kept at low pressure to minimise stress; a vehicle that is both large and light has an advantage during atmospheric reentry compared to other vehicles due to a low ballistic coefficient. Because of the low ballistic coefficient, Skylon would be slowed at higher altitudes where the air is thinner; as a consequence, the skin of the vehicle would reach only . The Skylon design does not require such an approach, instead opting for using a far thinner yet durable reinforced ceramic skin; however, due to turbulent flow around the wings during re-entry, some sections of the vehicle shall need to be provided with active cooling systems.

The Skylon shall possess a retractable undercarriage, equipped with high pressure tyres and water-cooled brakes; if any difficulties were to occur just before a take-off, the brakes would be applied to stop the vehicle, the water boiling away to dissipate the heat.

Support facilities
The Skylon would be able to land on a  Code F civil runway.

When on the ground, it would undergo inspection and necessary maintenance, with a turnaround time of approximately two days, and be able to complete at least 200 orbital flights per vehicle.

Specifications (Skylon D1)

See also
 Reaction Engines A2, a Reaction design for an antipodal airliner using similar engine technology
 CFASTT-1, a similar design by University of Strathclyde
 Reusable launch system

References

Citations

Bibliography

 
  IAC-15,D2,1,8,x31601

External links

 Reaction Engines Limited
 Mark Hempsell from REL on The Space Show talking about Skylon
 World Tiles Skylon model
 Liquid Air Cycle Engine (LACE) rocket equation reasonably well predicts the performance of Skylon
 Video animation TROY Mars Mission Concept
 Video – SKYLON – Operations from Reaction Engines Ltd on Vimeo.

Space programme of the United Kingdom
Canard aircraft
Hydrogen-powered aircraft
Hypersonic aircraft
Mixed-power aircraft
Proposed space vehicles
Reaction Engines aircraft
Proposed reusable launch systems
Rocket-powered aircraft
Single-stage-to-orbit
Spaceplanes
Pre-cooled air-breathing rocket engines